Dolicharthria cerialis is a moth in the family Crambidae. It was described by Stoll in 1782. It is found in Suriname.

References

Moths described in 1782
Spilomelinae
Moths of South America